The Kelasuri or  Kelasyri , also  Kalashir   ( [Kyalashir],  [Kelasuri])  — river in Abkhazia.

The source is located on the glacier  at Bzyb Range. Kelasuri begins at the merger of Kelasuri First and Kelasuri Second rivers.

The river flows along the administrative border of the Sukhumi and Gulripshi districts.

The river sources are glacial water and rain. A significant part of the river bed runs along the gorge.  from the center Sukhum and flows into the Black Sea. It is one of the largest rivers in Abkhazia.

References 

Rivers of Abkhazia
Rivers of Georgia (country)
Tributaries of the Black Sea